Discoid may refer to:

 Disk (mathematics), the region in a plane enclosed by a circle

Medicine 
 Furosemide, a medication sold under the trade name Discoid
 Discoid meniscus, a human anatomical variant
 Discoid lupus erythematosus, a chronic skin condition in humans
 Canine discoid lupus erythematosus, the equivalent condition in dogs
 Nummular dermatitis, also known as discoid eczema

Biology 
 Discoid head, a type of floret arrangement in Asteraceae flower heads
 Discoidal cleavage, a type of partial cleavage in embryos
 Discoidin domain, a protein domain of many blood coagulation factors
 Blaberus discoidalis, the discoid cockroach
 Dictyostelium discoideum, a slime mold

Other 
 Discoidal stele, a funerary stele type found in Basque country

See also 
 Disc (disambiguation)